Jano Toussounian (born 25 January 1991) is an Australian actor and comedian. He is best known for his role as Chase Day in 60 Minutes (Australian TV program) and Anton Young in Supreme Justice with Judge Karen.

Early life
Toussounian was born in Sydney, Australia. He is of Armenian descent. Jano attended Loyola Senior High School.

Career
After completing school at Loyola Senior High School, Toussounian went on to complete various acting courses. It was in 2009 where he starred in his first short film, Unfinished Business. In 2010 he also starred in the short films The Coin and No Clue. In 2011 Jano graduated from Screenwise Film and Television School completing the 2 Year Intensive Course. He also landed a role in an Australian feature film named The Unjudged. This feature marked Toussounians film debut. He made his television debut by featuring in a Rexona commercial. Toussounian is also featured in the MTV pilot Sick playing Chef. In 2012 Jano appeared in a 60 Minutes re-enactment scene for the chilling story of Matthew Milat, nephew of backpacker’s murderer Ivan Milat. He played the role of whistle blower Chase Day. He also appeared in commercials for Rexona Clinical Protection, Foxtel HD, Nature’s Own: Bananas and Toyota Corolla, Woodside Oil and Origin Energy. In 2013 he was cast in the Australian film Super Awesome! and will be playing the character of Basil Cherry. Jano appeared in an episode of Supreme Justice with Judge Karen. The episode aired on KCAL-TV/CBS, KDOC-TV and WBBZ-TV. He also filmed a small role on Maz Jobrani's comedy film Jimmy Vestvood: Amerikan Hero and a role on Tattoo Nightmares, part of Spike (TV network). In 2017 he appeared in the ABC (Australian TV channel) television series Man Up.

Filmography

See also 
 List of Armenians
 Armenian Australian
 List of Armenian actors
 25 January
 Loyola Senior High School, Mount Druitt

External links

References

1991 births
Living people
Male actors from Sydney
Ethnic Armenian male actors
Australian male comedians